() is a centre-right political coalition in Argentina. It was created in 2015 as Cambiemos, and renamed in 2019. It is composed of Republican Proposal, Radical Civic Union, Civic Coalition ARI and United Republicans.

These three parties respectively nominated Mauricio Macri, Ernesto Sanz, and Elisa Carrió as their representatives in the August 2015 primary elections, which were held to choose which candidate would run in the 2015 presidential election on 25 October. On 9 August, Macri was elected as the candidate who would represent Cambiemos in the presidential election; on 22 November, where he won in second round by 51%.

It wants the definitive modernization of the country and the creation of a new anti-populist and republican-liberal political culture.

Creation

Initially, the pre-candidates Mauricio Macri, Daniel Scioli, and Sergio Massa had a triple tie in the polls for the 2015 presidential election. Scioli was the candidate of the Front for Victory, the ruling party at the time.

The other parties created a political coalition, the Broad Front UNEN. Elisa Carrió, leader of the Civic Coalition, left UNEN and joined a coalition with Macri's PRO instead. Both of them would run in the primary elections.

The Radical Civic Union was divided: Ernesto Sanz proposed to join Macri as well, and Julio Cobos proposed to stay in UNEN. The party held a convention to decide what to do, and Sanz's proposal prevailed. Thus, the UCR left UNEN and joined the PRO-CC.

The new coalition was named "Cambiemos", suggesting a change from the 12-year long rule of center-left Kirchnerists.

History

Macri, Sanz, and Carrió ran to be the nominee in the primary elections with Macri winning by a wide margin. He won the presidential election against the Kirchnerite candidate Daniel Scioli in a ballotage. In lower-level posts, Horacio Rodríguez Larreta was elected as Macri's replacement, keeping the City of Buenos Aires under coalition control. Alfredo Cornejo and Gerardo Morales became governors of Mendoza and Jujuy Provinces, respectively. María Eugenia Vidal defeated Aníbal Fernández and became the governor of the populous Buenos Aires Province, ending 28 years of Peronist control.

The 2017 Argentine legislative election renewed a third of the seats in the Senate and half in the Chamber of Deputies. The result was a victory for the ruling Cambiemos alliance, being the most voted force in 13 of the 24 districts.

In June 2019, an extension of the Cambiemos alliance was made: it is renamed Together for Change, by adding to Federal Peronism led by Miguel Ángel Pichetto, who would share the presidential formula of space together with Mauricio Macri. In the 2019 presidential elections, JxC was in second place, with 40% of the votes, behind Alberto Fernández, who won first round with 48% of the votes.

In the province of Buenos Aires, Governor María Eugenia Vidal sought re-election but was defeated by the candidate of the Frente de Todos, Axel Kicillof, who won 52% of the votes against 38% obtained by JxC.

In the City of Buenos Aires, Horacio Rodríguez Larreta joins the Radical Civic Union and the Socialist Party to the district alliance and is reelected as Chief of Government with 56% of the votes in the first round.

On 10 December 2019, the Centre-Left Alberto Fernández of the Justicialist Party was inaugurated President, after defeating the incumbent Mauricio Macri in the 2019 Argentine general election.

On 14 November 2021, the center-left coalition of Argentina's ruling Peronist party,  Frente de Todos (Front for Everyone), lost its majority in Congress for the first time in almost 40 years in midterm legislative elections. The election victory of Juntos por el Cambio meant a tough final two years in office for President Alberto Fernández. Losing control of the Senate made it difficult for him to make key appointments, including to the judiciary. It also forced him to negotiate with the opposition every initiative he sends to the legislature.

Positions
According to the media, Cambiemos is a center-right coalition, because it is led by Mauricio Macri.

Hours after Argentina's political landscape underwent a tectonic rightward shift, president-elect Mauricio Macri announced a series of radical changes that would realign his country's place in the world. Macri said he would tear up Argentina's memorandum of understanding with Iran, seek Venezuela’s exclusion from the regional free trade association Mercosur and ease away from a fixed exchange rate with the dollar. This is the "change of an era we need to be in the world", he declared at a press conference.

He aligned the country with gradualist neoliberalism and re-opened Argentina to international markets by lifting currency controls, restructuring sovereign debt, and pressing free-market solutions.

President Mauricio Macri said he would seek more sweeping reforms for Argentina after his governing coalition scored a resounding victory in 2017 congressional elections. Macri told reporters Argentinians should expect reforms in tax, education and labor, without providing details. The conservative leader had  been pushing a free-market reform agenda to try to overhaul Argentina's economy.

His presidency has been criticized for failing to materially reform the economy while receiving praise for leaving a legacy of anti-corruption and increasing Argentina's sovereign marketability.

Domestic policies

The members of Cambiemos were constituted to "promote economic development, the strengthening of democracy and the republican system, the independence of justice, the quality of education, social solidarity, and the personal happiness of the inhabitants of the Argentine Republic."

Economic policies

Mauricio Macri received a country with huge economic problems, and sought to reverse things. Quickly, moved from a fixed exchange-rate system to a floating one, removed taxes on exports and reduced subsidies on energy, to reduce the fiscal deficit.

Macri avoided to use a shock therapy and introduced the changes in a gradual way.

In April 2016, he negotiated with the vulture fund and ended the default to return to the international capital markets.

Until January 2018, the gradualist system was working well, although at a slower pace than needed.

Since May 2018, as part of an agreement with the International Monetary Fund, the government accelerated the austerity plans, aiming to completely remove the fiscal deficit.

Social policies

Domestically, he pursued moderate socially liberal policies, liberalized the energy sector, and combatted public corruption.

Macri named two Supreme Court justices.

President Mauricio Macri encouraged the discussion of an abortion law during the 2018 opening of regular sessions of the National Congress of Argentina. The bill, called "Voluntary termination of pregnancy", divided the coalition, that had no official position and the legislators voted according their beliefs.

Mauricio Macri, Maria Eugenia Vidal, Horacio Rodríguez Larreta, Elisa Carrió, and ministers Marcos Peña, Rogelio Frigerio, Esteban Bullrich, etc., are anti-abortion; Martin Lousteau, Mario Negri, Luis Petcoff Naidenoff and ministers Sergio Rubinstein, Patricia Bullrich, Sergio Bergman, Juan José Aranguren, etc.; are pro-abortion.

In this coalition of 108 members, the rejection of the project was imposed, with 65 negative votes compared to 42 positive.

Within the ruling alliance, the PRO prevailed with the negative vote (37) - it should be remembered that President Mauricio Macri had expressed himself "in favor of life" - while 17 voted for the positive. In radicalism, 24 supported the initiative, 16 rejected it. In the Civic Coalition, of its 10 members, only Juan Manuel López voted in favor.

When the bill was brought up again in late 2020, the coalition split, with 69 voting against and 42 in favour. In the PRO 40 members voted against while only 11 voted in favour, while in the Civic Coalition 4 supported the bill and 9 voted against. In contrast the radicals saw a greater endorsement of the bill, having 27 of its members in support and only 18 against.

In the senate the coalition was divided more evenly, with 11 members voting in favour and 14 against. It also resulted in an inversion of party support, with a majority of PRO voting favourably (5 yes and 3 no), while the radicals voted 9 against and 5 in favour. Other minor parties in JxC on both chambers also voted in different positions.

Foreign policy

Cambiemos opposes strongly the regime of Nicolás Maduro in Venezuela for human rights abuses and calls for a restoration of democracy in the country. It recognized Juan Guaidó, who was elected President of Venezuela by the National Assembly during the Venezuelan presidential crisis of 2019.

Macri improved the relations with the United States
and from Mercosur achieved a free trade agreement with the European Union and closer ties with the Pacific Alliance.

Macri and his Foreign Minister Susana Malcorra endorsed Democrat Hillary Clinton in the 2016 US presidential election, which was won by Republican Donald Trump.

Mauricio Macri said he wanted to start a "new kind of relationship" with the United Kingdom over the Falkland Islands as he tried to move his country towards a centrist position in world affairs.

During the first week in office, Macri annulled the Memorandum of understanding between Argentina and Iran, which would have established a joint investigation into the 1994 bombing with AMIA, a terrorist attack on a Jewish organization for which Argentina blamed Hezbollah and Iran.

Presidents

Members

Electoral performance

President

Legislative elections

Chamber of Deputies

Senate

References

External links

  

2015 establishments in Argentina
Anti-nationalist parties
Neoliberalism
Political party alliances in Argentina
Radical Civic Union